Vidéotron Centre (French: Centre Vidéotron) is an indoor arena in Quebec City, Quebec, Canada. The 18,259-seat arena replaced Colisée Pepsi as Quebec City's primary venue for indoor events. The arena is primarily used for ice hockey, serving as the home arena of the Quebec Remparts of the QMJHL and has been prospected as a venue for a new or re-located National Hockey League team in Quebec City, and as part of a Winter Olympic Games bid. The building opened on September 8, 2015. It is now the seventh-largest indoor arena in Canada, and the largest that does not host an NHL team.

History
A groundbreaking ceremony for the new arena was held on September 3, 2012, attended by then-Quebecor Chairman Pierre Karl Péladeau, then-Premier of Quebec Jean Charest, and former Quebec Nordiques players Michel Goulet, Peter Šťastný, and Alain Côté. Arena construction began on September 10, 2012.

The arena was expected to cost $400 million, but cost $370 million instead with the city and province covering 50% of the cost of the arena. On March 1, 2011 Quebecor entered into an agreement to acquire management rights to the new arena, a deal expected to be between $33 million and $63 million up front, plus between $3.15 million and $5 million in annual rent. The value of the deal will increase if an NHL franchise moves into the arena; Quebecor has actively backed an expansion franchise for Quebec City. This arrangement was made without public tender, for which the provincial government provided legal immunity.

As part of the management contract, Quebecor also holds the arena's naming rights; on April 7, 2015, it was announced that the arena would carry the name of Quebecor-owned cable company Vidéotron, and be known as the Videotron Centre (Centre Vidéotron in French).

The arena held its official opening on September 3, running public two-hour tours for the following three days. It hosted its first Quebec Remparts game on September 12, with a game against the Rimouski Oceanic setting a QMJHL attendance record of 18,259.

Design

The arena is comparable in size to PPG Paints Arena, the home arena of the Pittsburgh Penguins, and occupies approximately 64,000 square metres of space, down from the originally proposed 70,000 square metres. The design is also similar to Rogers Place, the home arena of the Edmonton Oilers. A television studio, valued at between C$30 million and C$40 million, is constructed within the arena.

Populous architect and lead project designer Kurt Amundsen described the arena as having a "hockey-first" design suiting the preferences of Canadian fans (who Amundsen described as being more interested in the game itself rather than in-arena entertainment), with a bowl that is "as steep and tight as it could possibly get", allowing spectators to "feel like [they] are on top of the ice". The angle of the upper seating bowl is so steep that rails had to be installed at every row to satisfy local building code requirements.

Notable events
Two days after playing the last event of its predecessor, Colisée Pepsi, Metallica played the first-ever concert at Videotron Centre on September 16, both as part of their Lords of Summer Tour.

Rihanna played at the venue on April 5, 2016 as an act of her Anti World Tour.

To this day, Celine Dion is the singer who has played the venue the most times, for a total of 8 concerts. During her Summer Tour 2016, she played the arena 5 times in front of 67 368 spectators. In 2019, she launched her Courage World Tour at the arena with 3 concerts in front of 39 930 spectators.

Videotron Centre has hosted the Quebec International Pee-Wee Hockey Tournament since 2016.

References

External links

  

Indoor arenas in Quebec
Indoor ice hockey venues in Quebec
Music venues in Quebec
Music venues completed in 2015

Sports venues completed in 2015
Quebecor
Sports venues in Quebec City
Quebec Major Junior Hockey League arenas
Quebec Remparts
2015 establishments in Quebec